Kladorub Glacier is the 14 km long and 3.5 km wide glacier on Nordenskjöld Coast in Graham Land situated southwest of Aleksiev Glacier and northeast of Vrachesh Glacier.  It drains the southeast slopes of Detroit Plateau, flows southeastwards between Cruyt Spur and Papiya Nunatak, and turns east to enter Desislava Cove in Weddell Sea.  The feature is named after the settlement of Kladorub in Northwestern Bulgaria.

Location
British mapping in 1978.

Maps
 British Antarctic Territory.  Scale 1:200000 topographic map.  DOS 610 Series, Sheet W 64 60.  Directorate of Overseas Surveys, Tolworth, UK, 1978.
 Antarctic Digital Database (ADD). Scale 1:250000 topographic map of Antarctica. Scientific Committee on Antarctic Research (SCAR), 1993–2016.

References
 Kladorub Glacier. SCAR Composite Antarctic Gazetteer.
 Bulgarian Antarctic Gazetteer. Antarctic Place-names Commission. (details in Bulgarian, basic data in English)

External links
 Kladorub Glacier. Copernix satellite image

Bulgaria and the Antarctic
Glaciers of Nordenskjöld Coast